Fadel Ahmad is a UAE footballer. He currently plays as a left winger .

Fadel has started his career in Al Ain Club, But in the 2007-08 season he was loaned to Al Wasl FC where he was able to shine and prove himself to secure a full transfer deal with Al Wasl in the next season.

Fadel paid a spectacular effort in the 2009-10 season where he played vital role in Al Wasl FC success in winning the 2009-10 Gulf Club Champions Cup. He was also selected as the tournament's best player.

Notes

Living people
Al-Wasl F.C. players
Al Ain FC players
Hatta Club players
Dubai CSC players
Emirati footballers
1985 births
UAE First Division League players
UAE Pro League players
Association football wingers